Delayed ejaculation (DE) describes a man's inability or persistent difficulty in achieving orgasm, despite typical sexual desire and sexual stimulation. Generally, a man can reach orgasm within a few minutes of active thrusting during sexual intercourse, whereas a man with delayed ejaculation either does not have orgasms at all or cannot have an orgasm until after prolonged intercourse which might last for 30–45 minutes or more. Delayed ejaculation is closely related to anorgasmia.

In the Diagnostic and Statistical Manual of Mental Disorders (DSM), fifth edition, the definition of DE requires 1 of 2 symptoms: either a marked delay in or a marked infrequency or absence of ejaculation on 75% to 100% of occasions for at least 6 months of partnered sexual activity without the individual desiring delay, and causing significant distress to the individual. DE is meant to describe any and all of the ejaculatory disorders that result in a delay or absence of ejaculation. The Third International Consultation on Sexual Medicine defined DE as an IELT threshold beyond 20 to 25
minutes of sexual activity, as well as negative personal consequences such as bother or distress. Of note, most men's intravaginal ejaculation latency time range is approximately 4 to 10 minutes. While ejaculatory latency and control were significant criteria to differentiate men with DE from those without ejaculatory disorders, bother/distress did not emerge as a significant factor.

Delayed ejaculation is the least common of the male sexual dysfunctions, and can result as a side effect of some medications. In one survey, 8% of men reported being unable to achieve orgasm over a two-month period or longer in the previous year. DEs are either primary and lifelong or acquired. Acquired DEs may be situational. While most men do experience occasional or short term delayed ejaculation issues, the prevalence of lifelong DE and acquired long term DE is estimated around 1% and 4%, respectively.

Signs and symptoms
Delayed ejaculation can be mild (men who still experience orgasm during intercourse, but only under certain conditions), moderate (cannot ejaculate during intercourse, but can during fellatio or manual stimulation), severe (can ejaculate only when alone), or most severe (cannot ejaculate at all). All forms may result in a sense of sexual frustration. In most cases, delayed ejaculation presents the condition in which the man can climax and ejaculate only during masturbation, but not during sexual intercourse. As of 2015, the DSM-V uses the term "delayed ejaculation" instead of older terms such as "inhibited ejaculation", "impotent ejaculation" or "retarded ejaculation". To determine what amount of time counts as delayed, one source uses a measurement of the mean time for a man to achieve ejaculation in a study of 500 couples having heterosexual vaginal intercourse, which was 8 minutes (with a standard deviation of 7.1 minutes).Due to men's reputation for being reliably able to ejaculate during sex, in cases where a man faces delayed ejaculation, the woman may perceive that it is due to her not being attractive or due to a fault in her sexual techniques.

Causes
The etiologies of delayed ejaculation can be age-related, organic, psychological, or pharmacological.

Primary lifelong DEs are poorly understood and rarely explained by few congenital anatomic causes (viz., Müllerian duct cyst, Wolfian duct abnormalities, prune belly syndrome, imperforate anus, congenital ejaculatory duct obstruction, genetic abnormalities including cystic fibrosis, etc.)

Anatomic causes (acquired ejaculatory duct obstruction)
Infective/Inflammation (residual damage from acute infections, chronic infections, urethritis, prostatitis, orchitis, genitourinary tuberculosis, schistosomiasis, lichen sclerosis, etc.)
Neurogenic causes (diabetic autonomic neuropathy, spinal cord or nerve root injury from trauma or disc prolapse, multiple sclerosis, etc.). DE can be due to the injury to pelvic nerves responsible for orgasm from trauma as a result of pelvic surgery (viz., prostate surgery including  transurethral resection of prostate and bladder neck incision, proctocolectomy, bilateral sympathectomy, abdominal aortic aneurysmectomy, para-aortic lymphadenectomy etc.). Some men report a lack of sensation in the nerves of the glans penis, which may or may not be related to external factors, including a history of circumcision.
Endocrine (hypogonadism, pituitary disorders such as hyperprolactinaemia and Cushing's disease, thyroid disorders, etc.). Although low testosterone level had been considered a risk factor in the past, more recent studies have not confirmed any association between ejaculation times and serum testosterone levels.
Delayed ejaculation is a possible side effect of alcohol  and certain medications, including antipsychotics, antidepressants including selective serotonin reuptake inhibitors (SSRIs), opiates such as morphine or oxycodone, many benzodiazepines such as Valium or Xanax, and certain antihypertensives including thiazide diuretics, alpha-adrenergic blockers and ganglion blockers. Although they may increase sexual desire, stimulants such as amphetamines and cocaine have an inhibitory effect on ejaculation, and can cause erectile dysfunction and reduced penile sensitivity via their vasoconstrictive effects.
Psychological (acute psychological distress, relationship distress, psychosexual skill deficit, disconnect between arousal and sexual situations, masturbation style and frequency, etc.) 
Psychological and lifestyle factors have been discussed as potential contributors, including insufficient sleep, distraction due to worry, distraction from the environment, anxiety about pleasing their partner and anxiety about relationship problems.
Religious guilt over sex can cause delayed ejaculation.
"Spectatoring", the problem of perceiving sex as a performance rather than a mutual experience and process of pleasure "in the moment" can cause delayed ejaculation.
Men who are solely aroused by sexual fetishes may be unable to ejaculate from regular intercourse. 
Idiosyncratic masturbation and lack of desire for stimuli are also proposed risk factors for DE. The word Idiosyncratic means something that pertains to an individual. In this case, it means a person who has a way of masturbating that is unique (or out of the ordinary). Most men stroke their penis with their hand in a way that vaguely imitates the stimulation from intercourse. An idiosyncratic style is defined as a technique not easily duplicated by a partner utilizing their hand, mouth, anus, or vagina. In these patients delayed ejaculation is adaptation to a certain masturbatory technique. Lawrence Sank (1998) wrote about the "Traumatic masturbatory syndrome", when the sensations a man feels when masturbating may bear little resemblance to the sensations he experiences during intercourse. Factors such as pressure, angle and grip during masturbation can make for an experience so different from sex with a partner that the ability to ejaculate is reduced or eliminated. One in three men with DE report Idiosyncratic masturbation. Also, high-frequency masturbation is associated with prolonged DE in penetrative sex with the partner accounting for another one third of the cases. Fantasy/partner disparity – that is to say, variant sexual fantasy during masturbation that was not incorporated into sex with their partner – accounted for one in five DEs. According to DSM-5-TR, "Delayed ejaculation is associated with highly frequent masturbation, use of masturbation techniques not easily duplicated by a partner, and marked disparities between sexual fantasies during masturbation and the reality of sex with a partner."
Intravaginal ejaculation disorder is a peculiar Japanese case, but is very similar to "traumatic masturbatory syndrome," which is also mainly caused by intense masturbation.

Diagnosis 
Diagnosis and management of DE warrant one of the most comprehensive medical evaluation in sexual health assessment that includes a full medical and sexual history performed along with a detailed physical examination. Understanding the quality of the sexual response cycle (desire, arousal, ejaculation, orgasm, and refractory period); details of the ejaculatory response, sensation, frequency, and sexual activity/techniques; cultural context and history of the disorder; partner's assessment of the disorder and if the partner has any sexual dysfunction themselves; and the overall satisfaction of the sexual relationship are all important to garner during history-taking.

Relatively normal latency to orgasm with self masturbation as compared to insertive or intravaginal ejaculation latency time reasonably rules out most of the organic causes of DEs.

Treatment
Primary, lifelong DEs are poorly understood and hence less well studied. Organic causes in the acquired DEs should be addresses promptly. Retraining masturbatory practices and re-calibrating the mismatch of sexual fantasies with arousal are essential when these are contributing to DE. Techniques geared towards reduction of anxiety are important skills that can help overcome performance anxiety, as this can often interrupt the natural erectile function through orgasmic progression.

Sex therapy
Therapy usually involves homework assignments and exercises intended to help a man get used to having orgasms through insertional intercourse, vaginal, anal, or oral, that is through the way to which he is not accustomed. Commonly, the couple is advised to go through three stages. At the first stage, a man masturbates in the presence of his partner. Sometimes, this is not an easy matter as a man may be used to having orgasms alone. After a man learns to ejaculate in the presence of his partner, the man's hand is replaced with the hand of his partner. In the final stage, the receptive partner inserts the insertive partner's penis into the partner's vagina, anus, or mouth as soon as the ejaculation is felt to be imminent. Thus, a man gradually learns to ejaculate inside the desired orifice by an incremental process.

Medication
There is as yet no reliable medication for all cases of delayed ejaculation. Some studies have found that PDE5 inhibitors such as Viagra have little effect. Viagra can have a delaying effect on ejaculation, possibly through additional effect in the brain or decrease of sensitivity in the head of the penis.

Cabergoline, an agonist of dopamine D2 receptors which inhibits prolactin production, was found in a small study to fully restore orgasm in one third of anorgasmic subjects, and partially restore orgasm in another third. Limited data has shown that the drug amantadine may help to relieve SSRI-induced orgasmic dysfunction. Cyproheptadine, buspirone, stimulants such as amphetamines (including the antidepressant bupropion), nefazodone has been used to treat SSRI-induced anorgasmia. Reducing the SSRI dosage may also resolve anorgasmia problems. Yohimbine has been shown to be effective in the treatment of orgasmic dysfunction in men.

Other
Meditation has demonstrated effectiveness in case studies.

See also
 Anorgasmia
 Edging (sexual practice)
 Premature ejaculation
 Retrograde ejaculation
 Sexual repression

References

External links 

 Medline Plus Medical Encyclopedia – Delayed ejaculation.

 

Sexual health
Orgasm
Ejaculation